The Holy Trinity Church is an Macedonian Orthodox cemetery church in the neighbourhood of Novo Selo, Štip. The church is registered as a Cultural Heritage of North Macedonia.

History

It was built in the period 1922 to 1925. It was consecrated in 1925, but there is no information from whom. The church is a founding work of Todor Čepreganov from Štip.

Gallery

See also
 Jewish Cemetery - a cultural heritage site
 Dormition of the Theotokos Church - the seat of Novo Selo Parish and a cultural heritage site
 Ascension of Christ Church - a cultural heritage site
 Saint John the Baptist Church - a cultural heritage site

References

External Links
 The official website of Breganica Diocese

Churches in North Macedonia
Cultural heritage of North Macedonia